Jean Maurice Paul Jules de Noailles, 6th Duke of Ayen (Paris, 18 September 1893 – Bergen-Belsen, 14 April 1945) was the son of Adrien de Noailles, 8th Duke of Noailles.

He married Solange Marie Christine Louise de Labriffe (Amiens, 5 September 1898 – Paris, 3 November 1976) in Paris on 16 June 1919. Together they had two children:
Geneviève Hélène Anne Marie Yolande (28 June 1921, Paris – 29 November 1998), who married Jean Gaston Amaury Raindre (born 9 January 1924, Versailles) in New York, on 28 May 1947.
Adrien Maurice Edmond Marie Camille (27 February 1925, Paris  – 9 October 1944, Rupt-sur-Moselle).

He succeeded to the subsidiary title Duke of Ayen, but he and his son Adrien did not outlive his father, the 8th Duke of Noailles. The Dukedom of Noailles therefore passed to a cousin, François, 9th Duke of Noailles, though the château de Maintenon was inherited by his daughter Geneviève.

He was a member of the French Resistance, arrested by the Gestapo on 22 January 1942 as a result of an anonymous denunciation. He was tortured and  interned at the Paris Gestapo headquarters on  Avenue Foch and then in Compiègne, and then deported successively to  Buchenwald, Flossenburg, Oranienburg, and finally Bergen-Belsen, where he died a few days before the end of the war.

In October 1945, the Cannes municipal council decided to rename Avenue Bellevue to Avenue Jean de Noailles.

References

Jean-Maurice-Paul-Jules
Jean Maurice Paul Jules
Ayen, Jean-Maurice-Paul-Jules, 6th duc d'
Ayen, Jean-Maurice-Paul-Jules, 6th duc d'
French people who died in Bergen-Belsen concentration camp
Buchenwald concentration camp survivors
Flossenbürg concentration camp survivors
Oranienburg concentration camp prisoners
French Resistance members
Resistance members who died in Nazi concentration camps
French torture victims